Víbora River is a river in Santa Cruz Department, Bolivia.

References

Rivers of Santa Cruz Department (Bolivia)